Buchneria may refer to:
 Buchneria (millipede), a genus of millipedes in the family Julidae

 Buchneria, a fossil genus of mammals in the family Ochotonidae, synonym of Ochotona
 Buchneria, a genus of foraminifers in the family Ellipsolagenidae, synonym of Sipholagena